The 1907 French Grand Prix was a Grand Prix motor race held at Dieppe on 2 July 1907.

The Race
Thirty-eight cars set off at one-minute intervals to complete 10 laps of a  circuit on a triangular circuit near the city of Dieppe. The field was led away by Vincenzo Lancia's Fiat.
Louis Wagner led the race for the first three laps. After Wagner retired on lap four, Arthur Duray took the lead. Felice Nazzaro's Fiat led from this point until the finish, completing the race over six and a half minutes ahead of second placed Ferenc Szisz.

Death 
Albert Clément died in a crash during practice while driving his Clément-Bayard. His place in the race was taken by 'Alezy'.

Classification

References

French Grand Prix
French
Grand Prix